Brian Black is an American professor of history and environmental studies at Pennsylvania State University at Altoona and head of its department of Arts and Humanities.  He received a Bachelor of Arts in English in 1988 from Gettysburg College, a Master of Arts in American Civilization in 1991 from New York University and a Doctor of Education degree in American Studies from the University of Kansas in 1996.

Books 
Black is the author of :
 Petrolia: The Landscape of America's First Oil Boom (Johns Hopkins, 2003;)
 Crude Reality: Petroleum in World History (Rowman & Littlefield, 2012), selected as a CHOICE outstanding academic book for 2012
He is the editor of:
 Climate Change: An Encyclopedia of History and Science  (4 vols)

Other publications
Gettysburg Contested, August 15, 2013 |  | 
Nature and the Environment in Twentieth-Century American Life, May 30, 2006 |  | 
Nature and the Environment in Nineteenth-Century American Life, April 30, 2006 |  | 
America at War!: Battles That Turned the Tide, 1992 
Nature's Entrepot, November 16, 2012 |  | 
Alternative Energy, February 26, 2010 |  | 
Global Warming, June 2, 2010 |  | 
Great Debates in American Environmental History, May 30, 2008 |  |

References

External links

Year of birth missing (living people)
Living people
Gettysburg College alumni
New York University alumni
University of Kansas alumni
Pennsylvania State University faculty
21st-century American historians
21st-century American male writers
American non-fiction environmental writers
Environmental studies scholars
American male non-fiction writers